is a supernatural anime series produced by OLM. It is the sequel to the 2017 film Yo-kai Watch Shadowside: Oni-ō no Fukkatsu and a proper sequel to the original Yo-kai Watch anime series, originally based on the games created by Level-5. Yōichi Katō returned to officially direct and write the anime alongside new staff. It premiered in all TXN Stations in Japan from April 13, 2018  to March 29, 2019. It was replaced by the 2019 Yo-kai Watch! series in the same timeslot.

Just like the movie before it, the series takes a darker and more mature approach to the franchise, with a much higher focus on the story driven drama and conflict, as opposed to the original series which followed a comedic, segmented approach.

Plot 
Taking place after the events of the fourth film, the series centers on Tate Adams, Summer's brother who doesn't believe in supernatural phenomena. But as he notices his sister frequently comes back home late, he decides to stalk her, only to find out she is exorcising evil Yo-kai and running a Yo-kai detective agency. With their secret revealed to him, Summer decides to let him tag along in her activities as they investigate Yo-kai crimes and take on evil Yo-kai to maintain peace all over the city.

Meanwhile, Shutendoji (the one who had planned all the evil, as seen in an epilogue at the end of the fourth movie), accompanied by his Yo-kai bodyguard Doketsu, is in search of the "princess" that he has hoped to unite with, over the events of the anime. They both search for the "princess" while in their human disguises, and observing the actions of the Yo-kai detective agency.

Production
Before the reveal of Shadowside, the original anime saw a decline back in 2017 due to staggeringly low sales of later games in the main series and falling ratings for the first anime. The series was conceived after the production of the film, and was officially revealed in the March 2018 issue of Coro Coro Comic as the film serves as a prequel to the anime and the original anime series following the reported drop of interest to the IP. The anime, like the film that preceded it, follows a much darker route in order to gain interest from older viewers. Alongside the returning characters, two new Yo-kai designs have been revealed. Alongside the new designs, the characters of the film have different voice actors as well. The official promo video was shown in Anime Japan 2018, which details the series's plot.

Cast

 ケースケ / Natsume- 戸松遥
 ナツメ - 悠木碧
 トウマ - 長谷川芳明
 アキノリ - 田村睦心
 ウィスパー - 関智一
 ジバニャン - 黒田崇矢
 ミッチー - 小野坂昌也

Media

Anime
The anime officially premiered on all TXN stations in Japan, including TV Tokyo and TV Osaka on April 13, 2018, replacing the original Yo-kai Watch anime series in its timeslot, with the first and second episode premiering on the same day as a one-hour special. The first opening theme is titled  by Hard Birds while the first ending theme is titled  by King Cream Soda.

Episode List

Video game
Yo-kai Watch 4 was developed and published by Level-5 and it has been released on the Nintendo Switch on 20th June 2019 in Japan.

References

External links
Anime website 

2018 anime television series debuts
Animated television series about children
Japanese children's animated comedy television series
Japanese adult animated comedy television series
Japanese mythology in anime and manga
OLM, Inc.
Supernatural anime and manga
TV Tokyo original programming
Yo-kai Watch